Elections to Swindon Borough Council took place on 5 May 2022 as part of the 2022 local elections in the United Kingdom. The Conservatives lost 3 seats but maintained their majority control of the council.

Results summary

Ward results
Note: Vote share change is calculated based on the last time these seats were fought in 2018.

Blunsdon & Highworth

Central

Chiseldon & Lawn

Covingham & Dorcan

Eastcott

Gorse Hill & Pinehurst

Haydon Wick

Liden, Eldene & Park South

Lydiard & Freshbrook

Mannington & Western

Old Town

Penhill & Upper Stratton

Priory Vale

Rodbourne Cheney

Shaw

St Andrews

St Margaret & South Marston

Walcot & Park North

Wroughton & Wichelstowe

References 

2022
Swindon
2020s in Wiltshire